El Zahrat Language School (Z.L.S) is a governmental school in Heliopolis-(El Korba), Cairo, Egypt. Which offers Thanwya Amma in English. And it is a co-educational primary, preparatory & secondary school. it also offers kindergarten (K.G). On 6 November 2014 the government changed the name of the school to Al Shahid Mohamed Ahmed Lotfy Alashry.

External links
https://web.archive.org/web/20130225163812/http://alzahratschool.com/

References

Schools in Cairo